Friedrich Busse was a German fishing trawler that was requisitioned by the Kriegsmarine in the Second World War for use as a Vorpostenboot, serving as V 211 Friedrich Busse and V 212 Friedrich Busse. She was scuttled at Caen, Calvados, France in June 1944.

Friedrich Busse was salvaged in 1945 and used as the British salvage vessel King Hal before returning to service in 1946 as the Danish fishing trawler Tórhallur. She was sold to the Faroe Islands in 1948, then to West Germany in 1952, when she was renamed Delphin. She was sold to Greece in 1958 and was renamed Delfini in 1962. She ran aground and was wrecked at Casablanca, Morocco in 1972.

Description
The engine was made by Bremer Vulkan, Vegesack. It was rated at 115nhp. The engine powered a single screw propeller driven via a low pressure turbine, double reduction gearing and a hydraulic coupling.

History
Friedrich Busse was built as yard number 710 by Bremer Vulkan, Vegesack for F. Busse Hochseefischerei, Wesermünde. She was launched on 7 November 1934 and completed that month. The fishing boat registration PG 419 was allocated, as were the Code Letters DFCA.

Friedrich Busse was requisitioned by the Kriegsmarine on 16 September 1939 for use as a Vorpostenboot. She was allocated to 2 Vorpostenflotille as V 211 Friedrich Busse. She was redesignated V 212 Friedrich Busse on 20 October.

On 6 June 1944, Friedrich Busse was in port at Caen, Calvados, France when Operation Overlord started, and was trapped there with V 206 Otto Bröhan and the motor minesweeper R 231 as their retreat from the port had been cut off. All three vessels were scuttled with explosives on 12 June, with Friedrich Busse scuttled in the Caen Canal.

Friedrich Busse was refloated in 1945 and repaired, becoming the salvage vessel King Hal under British ownership. She was sold to Denmark in 1946 and returned to service as the fishing trawler Tórhallur. In 1948, she was sold to P/F Trolarafelagid "Tor", Thorshavn,  Faroe Islands. Her port of registry was Thorshaven, sailing under the Danish flag. The Code Letters OXUR were allocated. On 18 December 1952, Torhallur was sold to the Hochseefischerei Carl Kämpf, Bremerhaven, West Germany. She was allocated the fishing boat registration BX 372 and the Code Letters DFAL. She was sold to Agyris A. Theocharis, Ambelaki, Greece in December 1958 and was renamed Delfini in 1962. She was re-engined in that year; a diesel engine of 770ihp being fitted. On 18 January 1972, she ran aground on the Oukacha Rocks, off Casablanca, Morocco. She was declared a total loss.

References

Sources

1934 ships
Ships built in Bremen (state)
Fishing vessels of Germany
Steamships of Germany
World War II merchant ships of Germany
Auxiliary ships of the Kriegsmarine
Maritime incidents in June 1944

Steamships of the United Kingdom
Merchant ships of the United Kingdom
Steamships of Denmark
Merchant ships of Denmark
Steamships of the Faroe Islands
Merchant ships of the Faroe Islands
Steamships of West Germany
Fishing vessels of West Germany
Steamships of Greece
Fishing vessels of Greece
Maritime incidents in 1972
Shipwrecks in the Mediterranean Sea